Steve Mills may refer to:
Steve Mills (footballer) (1953–1988), English footballer with Southampton
Steve Mills (juggler) (born 1957), American juggler and unicyclist
Steve Mills (rugby union) (born 1951), English international rugby union player
Steve Mills (Shortland Street), a fictional character on the New Zealand soap opera Shortland Street
Steve Mills (sports executive) (born 1959), American sports executive
Steve Mills (vaudeville) (1895–1988), American vaudeville comedian

See also
 Stephen Mills (born 1960), American artistic director of Ballet Austin
 Stephen Mills (public servant) (1857–1948), Australian public servant
 Stephanie Mills (disambiguation)